is a town located in Nagano Prefecture, Japan. , the town had an estimated population of 6,088 in 2650 households, and a population density of 32.6 persons per km².

Geography
Nagawa is located in the center of Nagano Prefecture.

Surrounding municipalities
Nagano Prefecture
 Matsumoto
 Ueda
 Suwa
 Chino
 Shimosuwa
 Tateshina

Climate
The town has a climate characterized by characterized by warm and humid summers, and cold, very snowy winters (Köppen climate classification Dfb).  The average annual temperature in Nagawa is 8.9 °C. The average annual rainfall is 1388 mm with September as the wettest month. The temperatures are highest on average in August, at around 21.9 °C, and lowest in January, at around -3.6 °C.

Demographics
Per Japanese census data, the population of Nagawa has declined my more than half over the past 70 years.

History
The area of present-day Nagawa was part of ancient Shinano Province. The area was part of the holdings of Ueda Domain during the Edo period, and had two stations on the Nakasendō highway connecting Edo with Kyoto: Nagakubo-shuku and Wada-shuku. The modern town of Nagakubo-shinmachi was established on April 1, 1889 by the establishment of the municipalities system and was renamed Nagato on September 1, 1956. The town of Nagawa was formed by the merger of Nagato with the village of Wada (also from Chiisagata District on October 1, 2005 when the town.

Education
Nagawa has two public elementary schools and one public middle school operated by the town government, and one middle school operated jointly between Nagawa and neighboring Ueda city. The town does not have a high school.

Transportation

Railway
The town does not have any passenger railway service.

Highway

Local attractions
Hoshikuso Pass obsidian mine site, a National Historic Site

References

External links

Official Website 

 
Towns in Nagano Prefecture